William Stretton (April 1755 - 12 March 1828) was a builder and architect based in Nottingham.

Family

He was the eldest child of Samuel Stretton and was baptised at Lenton on 20 April 1755.

He married Suzanna Lynam, daughter of William Lynam, of Eakring, on 22 June 1778 in Eakring. The marriage produced six children, all of whom were given Christian names starting with “S”.

Stella, October 1779 - 5 November 1818
Sempronius, 15 May 1781 - 6 February 1842
Severus, 7 November 1783 - 19 December 1785
Salcia, born December 1784
Sabina, born July 1787
Severus William Lynam Stretton May 1793 - 22 November 1884

He died in his house at Lenton Priory on 12 March 1828. His death was announced in the Nottingham Journal
“On Wednesday, the 12th inst, in the 73 rd year of his age, after a long and painful affliction, sustained with true Christian fortitude and resignation, William Stretton, Esq., of Lenton Priory. Words would but faintly convey the deep grief which his irreparable loss has occasioned to those who knew his worth. In him antiquarians have lost a fund of general and useful knowledge, and the poor a warm and benevolent friend.

Business
He started as an architect and builder in Nottingham in partnership with his father, and took over the business when his father retired. In 1788 he built what is now 43, 45 and 47 in Castle Gate. In the 1790s he made some changes to Newdigate House.  In 1799 he is listed as a builder on the Long Row,

He rebuilt the Nottingham Exchange and restored St Mary's Church, Nottingham and St Peter's Church, Nottingham. He built St. James' Church, Standard Hill in 1808 and three houses between 1810 and 1814 on Standard Hill when this area was first developed.

He acquired a portion of land which had previously been the site of Lenton Priory and built a house there which he called Lenton Priory. This was occupied by the Sisters of Nazareth from 1880  who extended it. It has now been restored as part of a housing development, following the sale of the site by the Sisters of Nazareth.

He made a series of excavations on the site of Lenton Priory and discovered a magnificent Norman font which is now housed in Holy Trinity Church, Lenton.

The registers of St. Mary's Church, Nottingham, show that he was Churchwarden from Easter 1802 to Easter 1806. During his residence at Lenton Mr. Stretton took an active interest in all public matters, and filled the several parish offices in an efficient manner. He held the two offices of Overseer of the Poor and Surveyor of Highways in 1806 and was Churchwarden in 1810 and 1811. In 1815 he was appointed one of the Overseers of the Poor for Standard Hill.

References

1755 births
1828 deaths
Architects from Nottingham
People from Lenton, Nottingham